
Mirror Lake is a small, seasonal lake located on Tenaya Creek in Yosemite National Park. Situated in Tenaya Canyon directly between North Dome and Half Dome, it is the last remnant of a large glacial lake that once filled most of Yosemite Valley at the end of the last Ice Age, and is close to disappearing due to sediment accumulation.

See also
List of lakes in California

External links

Lakes of Yosemite National Park
Lakes of Mariposa County, California
Merced River
Tourist attractions in Mariposa County, California